Arijit Singh (born 25 April 1987) is an Indian singer and music composer. The recipient of several accolades including a National Film Award and six Filmfare Awards, he has recorded songs in several Indian languages and has established himself as one of the leading playback singers of Bollywood.

Singh began his career when he participated in the contemporary reality show, Fame Gurukul in 2005, but didn't receive widespread recognition before the release of "Tum Hi Ho" and "Chahun Main Ya Naa" in 2013. He is considered as one of the greatest singers of his generation. He was declared the most-streamed Indian artist of 2020, 2021 and 2022 by Spotify. He is the most followed Asian soloist on Spotify.

Early life 
Arijit Singh was born on 25 April 1987 in Jiaganj, Murshidabad, West Bengal to Kakkar Singh, a Punjabi Sikh father and Aditi Singh, a Bengali Hindu mother. His paternal family came from Lahore during the Partition. He began his music training at a very young age at home. His maternal aunt trained in Indian classical music, and his maternal grandmother used to sing. His maternal uncle played the tabla, and his mother also sang and played the tabla. He studied at Raja Bijay Singh High School and later at the Sripat Singh College, a University of Kalyani affiliate. According to him he "was a decent student, but cared more about music" and his parents decided to train him professionally. He was taught Indian classical music by Rajendra Prasad Hazari and trained in tabla by Dhirendra Prasad Hazari. Birendra Prasad Hazari taught him Rabindra Sangeet (songs written and composed by Rabindranath Tagore) and pop music. At the age of three, he started training under the Hazari brothers, and at the age of nine, he got a scholarship from the government for training in vocals in Indian classical music.

Growing up, he listened to Mozart, Beethoven and Bengali classical music. He idolized musicians like Bade Ghulam Ali Khan, Ustad Rashid Khan, Zakir Hussain and Anand Chatterjee, and enjoyed listening to Kishore Kumar, Hemant Kumar, and Manna Dey.

Early career 

Singh's musical career began when his guru Rajendra Prasad Hazari, who felt that "Indian classical music was a dying tradition", insisted him to leave his hometown and participate in the reality show Fame Gurukul (2005) at the age of 18. He was eliminated by audience polling, finishing in sixth place.

During the show, filmmaker Sanjay Leela Bhansali recognized his talent and had him sing "Yun Shabnami" a song scheduled to be used in his upcoming film Saawariya. During production, the script changed and the song was no longer required. It was never released. After the Fame Gurukul, Kumar Taurani, the head of Tips, signed him for an album which was never released.

He participated in another reality show 10 Ke 10 Le Gaye Dil and won. He chose to move to Mumbai in 2006 to freelance, staying in a rented room in the Lokhandwala area of the city. He invested the prize money of ₹10 Lakh from 10 ke 10 Le Gaye Dil to build his recording studio. He became a music producer and began composing music and singing pieces for advertisements, news channels and radio stations.

Singh spent a part of his early musical career as a music programmer and music producer for music directors such as Shankar–Ehsaan–Loy, Vishal–Shekhar, Mithoon, Monty Sharma and Pritam. While working with other composers he supervised the vocals, and the chorus sections, but it was while working with Pritam, that he began to produce and program music by himself.

Career

2010–13: Early releases and Aashiqui 2 

In 2010, Singh started working with Pritam on three films—Golmaal 3, Crook and Action Replayy. He started with singing scratches in the Telugu Film Industry with the 2010 film Kedi with the song "Neeve Na Neeve Na" composed by Sandeep Chowta. In 2011, Singh made his Bollywood musical debut with the Mithoon composition, "Phir Mohabbat" from Murder 2, which though he recorded it in 2009 was released in 2011. The same year, when he was programming for the song "Raabta" from Agent Vinod (2012), Pritam asked him to sing as well. The part was retained in all four versions of the song, and he was made to sing the entire composition in one of the versions. Apart from Agent Vinod, Singh dubbed for Pritam in three, other films released during the year: Players, Cocktail and, Barfi!.

He also sang for Chirantan Bhatt in 1920: Evil Returns for the song "Uska Hi Banana". Glamsham in its review of the song "Uska Hi Banana" wrote that Singh had sung the song intensely, emotionally and passionately and at a very high pitch.

He sang on Vishal–Shekhar's composition "Duaa" in the film Shanghai. It won him the Mirchi Music Award for Upcoming Male Playback Singer award. He was nominated in the same category for "Phir Le Aya Dil" from Barfi!.

Singh's breakthrough came in Aashiqui 2 where he was a lead and key vocalist and came to prominence with the release of the song "Tum Hi Ho" from the movie. The song won him several awards and nominations including Filmfare Award for Best Male Playback Singer. In the same year his 3 songs from Telugu movie  Swamy ra ra were also gained popularity.

Singh continued to work with Pritam, singing "Dilliwaali Girlfriend", "Kabira" and "Ilahi" for Yeh Jawaani Hai Deewani. Other than singing the encore version of "Kabira", he was the music producer of the track along with "Balam Pichkari" from the same film. Singh sang the song for Phata Poster Nikhla Hero titled "Main Rang Sharbaton Ka", also a composition by Pritam, as well as his song "Dhoka Dhadi" for R... Rajkumar.

He sang for Shah Rukh Khan in the song "Kashmir Main Tu Kanyakumari" from Chennai Express which was composed by Vishal–Shekhar. Apart from rendering the duet version of "Har Kisi Ko" from Boss along with Neeti Mohan, the year marked his collaboration with Sharib–Toshi on the song "Kabhi Jo Baadal Barse" from Jackpot, and with Sanjay Leela Bhansali on the semi-classical number, "Laal Ishq" from Goliyon Ki Raasleela: Ram-Leela. Later, Singh picked "Kabhi Jo Baadal Barse" as one of his favorite songs, he chose "Tose Naina" from Mickey Virus as "closest to his heart".

2014 

In 2014, Singh got the chance to work with two of his favourite music directors, Sajid–Wajid and A. R. Rahman. He performed two tracks on Main Tera Hero and the song "Raat Bhar" from Heropanti for Sajid-Wajid, and dubbed the Hindi version of the song "Medhuvaagathaan" from Kochadaiiyaan titled "Dil Chaspiya" for A. R. Rahman. He rendered three re-mixed songs Amit Trivedi's "Hungama Ho Gaya", a song for Yaariyan, Sharib-Toshi's "Samjhawan" for Humpty Sharma Ki Dulhania, and "Mast Magan" for 2 States, as well as "Jiya" for Gunday, and Arko Pravo Mukherjee's "Aaj Phir" for Hate Story 2. Singh worked with Vishal Bhardwaj, recording two songs from Haider and with Sachin–Jigar on "Jaise Mera Tu" in Happy Ending. The year marked his collaboration with many other music directors including Tony Kakkar and Palak Muchhal. During the year, he provided vocals for Mithoon on "Humdard" for Ek Villain and "Hai Dil Ye Mera" for Hate Story 2. He worked with Vishal–Shekhar on "Manwa Laage" for Happy New Year, and with Shankar–Ehsaan–Loy on "Sajde" for Kill Dil. He sang two songs on Sharib-Toshi's Zid, and on three tracks for Pritam Chakraborty's Holiday which was arranged by Singh himself. Jeet Gannguli's song Muskurane garnered him the most nominations for the year, while he received two Filmfare nominations for "Suno Na Sangemarmar" and the Sufi song "Mast Magan". Singh picked "Gulon Mein Rang Bhare"—originally sung by Mehdi Hassan and re-written for Haider by Vishal Bhardwaj—as his favorite track of the year.

2015 

Singh made his Tamil debut in 2015 with the song "Neeye Vaazhkai Enbena" from the film Pugazh. He also provided vocals for the Dance song "Sooraj Dooba Hain" from Roy, which was composed by Amaal Mallik, and written by Kumaar. It was dubbed the "Party Anthem of the Year". During the year he sang a duet "Agar Tum Saath Ho" with Alka Yagnik, from the movie Tamasha which is composed by A. R. Rahman and written by Irshad Kamil. He worked again with Amaal Mallik on the song "Khwaishein" from Calendar Girls. Apart from dubbing the Hindi version of the song "Pookkalae Sattru Oyivedungal" from Rahman's I, along with Shreya Ghoshal, Singh teamed up with Gannguli and Bobby–Imran for Khamoshiyan, where he performed the film's title song. He sang "Baatein Ye Kabhi Na" for Gannguli and "Tu Har Lamha" for Bobby-Imran. He collaborated with Gannguli on two other projects; "Teri Khushboo" for Mr. X and the title track for Hamari Adhuri Kahani. Besides working with Chirantan Bhatt on "Teri Meri Kahaani" and Sachin–Jigar on "Chunar", he worked with some new composers like Bann Chakraborty, Khamosh Shah, Jatinder Shah, and Manj Musik. Moreover, Singh recorded a reprise version of Sonu Nigam's 1999 song "Deewana Tera" for Ek Paheli Leela. The year marked the first collaboration between Singh and Himesh Reshammiya, on the song "Baaton Ko Teri" from All Is Well. He voiced Bhardwaj in "Shaam Ke Saaye" and "Kya Pataa" for Talvar and Drishyam respectively, and he performed Phantoms "Saware" and "Sooiyan" from Guddu Rangeela. As well as recording soundtracks, Singh released his second promotional single during the year. Titled, "Chal Waha Jaate Hain", the song is composed by Mallik and features Tiger Shroff and Kriti Sanon. Singh also made his Marathi debut with the song "Yaar Illahi – Qawwali" from the film Katyar Kaljat Ghusali.

In 2015, Chinmayi Sripada recorded a romantic duet titled "Sooiyan", written by Irshad Kamil and Amit Trivedi, with Singh for the Bollywood film Guddu Rangeela. Arijit was the lead vocalist on the soundtrack of the 2015 film Dilwale singing "Janam Janam". He sang the duet song "Gerua" composed by Pritam and written by Amitabh Bhattacharya with Antara Mitra featuring Shah Rukh Khan and Kajol in the music video, which received a good response. He sang the dance song "Tukur Tukur" on the movie Dilwale also composed by Pritam and written by Bhattacharya which was also well received.

Arijit completed shooting for his directorial debut in 2015. Titled Bhalobasar Rojnamcha, it is a Bengali feature film compiled with seven short films. Co-written by Singh, a work-in-progress version of the film has been sent to some film festivals abroad.

2016 

In early 2016, Singh sang "Yeh Fitoor Mera" written by Swanand Kirkire composed by Amit Trivedi. Firstpost in its review spoke positively of the song calling it a trademark song from the Fitoor album. Firstpost also commended Singh's singing. Singh made his Gujarati debut with the song "Satrangi Re" from the film Wrong Side Raju.

Some of his noteworthy Hindi songs of 2016 included "Soch Na Sake" which is a duet with Tulsi Kumar from the movie Airlift, composed by Amaal Mallik written by Kumaar, "Sanam Re" the title track of the movie Sanam Re, composed and written by Mithoon, "Bolna" from the movie Kapoor and Sons, and "Itni Si Baat Hain", a duet with Antara Mitra, composed by Pritam Chakraborty and written by Manoj Yadav.

Singh was the key vocalist on the Raaz Reboot soundtrack and sang "Lo Maan Liya" composed by Jeet Ganguly written by Kausar Munir from it. He also sang the haunting melody "Raaz Aakhein Teri" and "Yaad Hain Na" from the same film.

He sang the duet "Dharkhaast" from the film, Shivaay with Sunidhi Chauhan, the music is composed by Mithoon the lyrics are penned by Sayeed Quadri. Daily News and Analysis in their review of song "Dharkhaast" commended Singh and Sunidhi's singing.

As the key vocalist on the film Ae Dil Hai Mushkil  Singh sang the popular the title track "Ae Dil Hai Mushkil" composed by Pritam Chakraborty and written by Amitabh Bhattacharya. He also sang "Channa Mereya", which garnered over 110 million views. He rendered another chartbuster hit "Nashe Si Chadh Gayi" from Befikre. The promotional video for the song garnered over 330 million views on YouTube.

He also sang "Naina" from Dangal at the end of 2016. In its review, Zee News wrote Arijit Singh's "Naina song from Dangal will touch your heart",
and the Indian actor Varun Dhawan praised the song.

2017 

In 2017, he sang for Shah Rukh Khan and performed a romantic duet with Harshdeep Kaur called "Zaalima", composed by Pritam's JAM8 and written by Amitabh Bhattacharya from the movie Raees. Khan shared multiple teasers of the song before its full release. He provided vocals for Salim–Sulaiman's compositions "Kuch Parbat Hilayein" and "Babul Mora" written by Amitabh Bhattacharya from the inspirational movie Poorna. He rendered "Alvida" from the film Rangoon, which the Deccan Chronicle praised in its review of the movie.

He also sang the song "Roke Na Ruke Naina", composed by Amaal Mallik written by Kumaar from the film Badrinath Ki Dulhania, and the chorus song "Namami Brahmaputra" (English: I Bow to the Brahmaputra) composed by Papon and dedicated to the river Brahmaputra which flows in Assam and has high cultural, economic and social importance for the northeast Indian and Assamese people. He "Haareya", a song from the Hindi movie Meri Pyaari Bindu. and the song "Murshida" from the Begum Jaan written by Rahat Indori and composed by Anu Malik.

Singh sang "Phir Bhi Tumko Chaahunga", composed by Mithoon, with lyrics by Manoj Muntashir from the soundtrack of Half Girlfriend. Zee Music Company released it before their planned date due to public demand. He also sang "Pal Bhar" which is a reprise and extended version of song from Phir Bhi Tumko Chahunga. "Pal Bhar" is written by Muntashir and composed by Mithoon.

He was the lead vocalist on the film Raabta singing "Ik Vaari Aa", composed by Pritam, lyrics are penned by Amitabh Bhattacharya. The song is from the soundtrack of Indian film Raabta. Singh lent his vocals and played acoustic guitar with Roland Fernandes for the song "Lambiyaan si Judaiyaan" composed by JAM8 and written by Amitabh Bhattacharya, also on the film's soundtrack. He sang "Tera Hoke Rahoon" song composed by (Kaushik, Akash, Guddu) of JAM8, with lyrics by Bipin Das in the movie Behen Hogi Teri.

He sang "O Saathi", with the music composed and lyrics written by Mithoon from the Hindi film Shab, and the dance song, "Main Tera Boyfriend", with Neha Kakkar. It is written by Kumar and composed by Sourav Roy.

Singh was the lead singer of the Jagga Jasoos Soundtrack singing the dance song "Ullu ka Pattha" composed by Pritam and written by Amitabh Bhattacharya, a fun song titled "Galti Se Mistake", written by Amitabh Bhattacharya, and Pritam's composition "Jhumri Talaiyya" written by Amitabh Bhattacharya. He also sang "Phir Wahi" from Jagga Jasoos composed by Pritam and written by Amitabh Bhattacharya.

He sang for Shah Rukh Khan and performed the dance song "Beech Beech Main" from the film Jab Harry Met Sejal with additional vocals provided by Shefali Alvares and Shalmali Kholgade, as well as "Hawayein", composed by Pritam Chakraborty and written by Irshad Kamil. Indian media wrote that Singh's vocals in the song were "mesmerizing".

Singh sang "Bairagi" for the film Bareilly Ki Barfi. He also sang "Jaana Ve" and "Aaj Zid"  for Aksar 2. The music was composed by Mithoon and written by Sayeed Quadri. He also sang "Main Hoon Saath Tere" from Shaadi Mein Zaroor Aana, and sang and also made an appearance in the music video of the song "Pal", featured in the film Monsoon Shootout. Singh's voice texture in the song garnered favorable reviews from the Indian media.

2018 

In 2018, Singh sang "Aaj Se Teri" for the film Pad Man, composed by Amit Trivedi and written by Kausar Munir. He sang "Binte Dil" for the film Padmaavat written by A. M. Turaz and composed by Sanjay Leela Bhansali. He also sang another chartbuster titled "Subah Subah" for the film Sonu Ke Titu Ki Sweety with Prakriti Kakar, composed by Amaal Mallik and written by Kumaar as well as "Tera Yaar Hoon Main". He also sang for the films Dil Juunglee, 3 Storeys, Hichki, Raazi, Parmanu: The Story of Pokhran, Veere Di Wedding, 102 Not Out, Baazaar, Kedarnath and Karwaan.

2019 
In 2019 Singh sang "Ruan Ruan" from film Sonchiriya composed by Vishal Bhardwaj and penned by Varun Grover, followed by "Mere Pyare Prime Minister" from Mere Pyare Prime Minister on composition of Shankar–Ehsaan–Loy and lyrics of Gulzar.

In March his song "Ve Maahi" with Asees Kaur from film Kesari composed by Tanishk Bagchi was released. The song garnered 200 million views on YouTube by July 2019.

Then came "First Class" with Neeti Mohan and title song "Kalank" from film Kalank composed by Pritam Chakraborty and penned by Amitabh Bhattacharya.

When Obama Loved Osama (2018) Film

He rendered "Khairiyat" from the film Chhichhore composed by Pritam and written by Amitabh Bhattacharya. It was released in September 2019.

His song “Tujhe Kitna Chahne Lage hum” from blockbuster film Kabir Singh in 2019

In October his song "Ghungroo" with Shilpa Rao was released from the movie, War. Lyrics are written by Kumaar and music is given by Vishal–Shekhar

In Late December 2019, he sang "Dariyaganj" with Dhvani Bhanushali in the film Jai Mummy Di, composed by Amartya Bobo Rahut; written by Siddhant Kaushal.

2020 

In January 2020, 10 of his songs were released. Three songs released from the film Love Aaj Kal : "Shayad", "Haan Tum Ho" and "Haan Main Galat", which are composed by Pritam; Title Track of Chhapaak along with "Khulne Do" and "Sab Jhulas Gaya" composed by Shankar–Ehsaan–Loy written by Gulzar; "Dua Karo" from the film Street Dancer 3D is sang along with Bohemia; "Chal Ghar Chalen" is a song from the movie Malang composed by Mithoon; He has sung the songs "Azaadi Ke Liye" and "Mere Watan" from the Amazon Originals The Forgotten Army.

He has also sung a song in a Bengali film, Love Aaj Kal Porshu.

On 18 July 2020, Singh announced his upcoming venture in making non-film music under the banner "Oriyon Music".

He made an appearance in a music video from Sunny M.R.'s new single "Lifafe" on 31 July 2020.

In August 2020, Singh's song "Dil Ko Maine Di Kasam" was released, composed by Amaal Malik featuring actors Asim Riaz and Himanshi Khurana.

Singh released his first single "Rihaa"  under his banner Oriyon Music on 4 October 2020; along with the Bengali version "Mukto Kore Dao" on 10 October 2020; with the Hindi lyrics written by Shloke Lal and the Bengali lyrics written by Singh himself.

Singh also sang the songs "Aabaad Barbaad" and "Hardum Humdum" from Ludo. The film is directed by Anurag Basu and composed by Pritam.

2021 
In early January, Singh sang "O Saaiyan" from the film The Power, along with Raj Pandit.

On 12 March 2020, Singh revealed that he will be composing music for the film Pagglait under his banner Oriyon Music, making it his first time venture as a music composer in Bollywood. The soundtrack album was released on 15 March 2021 on various music streaming services. He also sang for other films like 83, Tadap, Sooryavanshi, Bhuj: The Pride of India, etc.

2022 
In January, Singh sang 2 songs "Soch Liya" and "Aashiqui Aa Gayi" from the movie Radhe Shyam. Arijit Singh and Shreya Ghoshal have sung for the movie Bachchan Pandey composed by Amaal Malik and lyrics written by Kumaar. Singh also sang "Kesariya" from the movie Brahmāstra.

Vocals and musical style 

Arijit is often compared to singer Atif Aslam for similar voice texture and tone. Regarding this, Aslam said "If God's kind to someone you should also respect them. Arijit has been blessed and people should respect him. I am no one to control anyone. We need to understand there's no such thing as number one." Music director Amaal Malik said: "...can’t compare anyone to Atif Aslam, he is a senior and has been around for years". "Arijit is Arijit, Atif is Atif, they have their own styles and strengths"

In an interview with The Times of India, Singh mentioned that he has a "natural voice" and said he did nothing special to maintain it. He has described his voice as "nasal" and believes that it matches with all the actors. Shekhar Ravjiani of the music director duo Vishal–Shekhar wrote that Singh's "vocal texture is brilliant. The way he emotes and the soul he puts into each song is exemplary." India Today describes his voice as "raw and grainy", whereas the paper's Moeena Halim identifies his voice as soulful and baritone, while the International Business Times considers his voice "soothing". Koimoi, in a review, commended his voice. Bollywood Hungama, in a review of Aashiqui 2, described Singh as a singer with a "rich texture and depth in his voice". However, they suggested he should "sing smoothly", without heavy breaths in between.
NewsX acclaimed Singh's voice.

Singh has said that he would most like to explore the classical music style. He has also said that he loves singing folk music and likes all genres except for heavy metal music—since it is too loud for him. Singh is most commonly known for his romantic songs and was associated with the tag "romantic singer". Regarding that, Singh said the tag of romantic singer is unintentional, as he has not planned his career. He is happy with the songs that come his way and tries to do his best. Singh does not believe that doing just one type of song is "hampering" his growth. However, through his career, he has explored different musical styles, including; a club party song "Raat Bhar", an electronic "Blame The Night", a Punjabi Folk "Samjhawan", a Sufi or Qawwali song "Mast Magan" and a ghazal titled "Gulon Mein Rang Bhare". Regarding the variety, Hindustan Times stated; "he can sing nice fun songs as well". According to Krsna "A vocalist needs to have all genres of music at his fingertips and Arijit has that." While reviewing the soundtrack of Main Tera Hero, Bollywood Hungama felt he "shines" in the form, which is a "totally different setup" from what he has done before.

Reviewing the song "Uska Hi Banana", Komoi described Singh's voice as "marvelous" and Glamsham wrote he sang it intensely, emotionally and passionately. Reviewing the emotional song "Chunar" dedicated to a mother from the movie Any Body Can Dance 2 Komoi wrote Singh's voice "truly converse the pain and the Indian musical arrangements work their magic along with the emotionally rich lyrics. The song finds an instant connect with the listener."
Singh's "mispronunciation" of the phonetic 'ta' syllable was criticized by India West while reviewing the song "Chunar". Similarly, Bollywood Hungama considered his pronunciation "flawed" in the title track of Khamoshiyan. However the producer of the film Khamoshiyan, Mahesh Bhatt said, "It is a sensational song. One of the best songs that I have heard in my lifetime and its poetry is simply brilliant."
While reviewing the rest of his tracks in the film, The Indian Express, felt that Singh's rendition of the song sounds as "he's on autopilot", though Rajiv Vijayakar from Bollywood Hungama felt his rendition was "emotional".
Reviewing the song "Soch Na Sake" with music composed by Amaal Mallik from the movie Airlift Bollywood Hungama acclaimed Singh's rendition of the song.

Singh insists on the presence of lyricists during recording sessions for a better understanding of the relevance of the words and feelings behind a song. He has said his favorite lyricists are Irshad Kamil, Sayeed Quadri, and Amitabh Bhattacharya. While talking with Subhash Ghai at a question and answers session at Whistling Woods International Campus on arts and technique of singing at the 5th Veda Cultural Hub, Arijit said "Singing is like talking. It is an art of expression. There are other factors too but they all follow on once you understand your lyrics and rhythm well. There are no rules. You just have to practice well." Sharing his childhood memories he said, "I mostly practiced modern Bengali and Indian classical music. My guru Rajendra Prasad Hazari inspired me to practice more of modern singing as according to him Indian classical was dying."

Public image and influences 

Arijit has shared his fondness for singer Kishore Kumar, while citing Mohit Chauhan and Atif Aslam as inspirations with whom he is often compared. Though he has been inspired by many artists, Singh named KK as his favorite singer along with Ayushmann Khurrana. He named Pritam Chakraborty, Vishal–Shekhar, Shankar–Ehsaan–Loy, Amit Trivedi, Mithoon and A. R. Rahman as his favorite music directors. Singh has idolized Ghulam Ali, Jagjit Singh and Mehdi Hassan.

In an interview with Filmbeat in April 2013, he declared that he is the biggest fan of singer Krishnakumar Kunnath (KK). His desire to sing for Aamir Khan came to reality in 2016 with the song "Naina" from Dangal. In an interview with The Indian Express, Singh stated that he loves the work of Shalmali Kholgade, Shefali Alvares, and Irfan. He also mentioned that his "current favorite" singer is Chinmayi.

In 2016 he appeared on the popular chat and comedy show The Kapil Sharma Show aired on Sony TV India. The show's host Kapil Sharma explained the difficulties he had bringing Singh on the show due to his shy nature.

Singh has often been portrayed by the Indian media as a "small-town boy who made it big". He had also been trolled on social media to which he replied "I use my social media sparingly for things that are close to my heart. I don't read the comments. My team filters out the comments for me, I don't involve myself a lot into paying attention to criticism on social media. I speak what I want to speak and my team lets me know the needful."

Arijit enjoys listening to retro songs by singers Lata Mangeshkar, Mohammed Rafi and the classical and ghazal songs along with the music of Coldplay. He expressed his desire to work with artist Norah Jones someday as he loves her music. He says he is uncomfortable with all the attention that fame has brought.

Singing style, impact and recognition 

In an interview music director and composer, Pritam said: "Arijit is a good singer, a smart musician, and an intelligent musician as well." Vishal Dadlani of the music director duo Vishal–Shekhar said Singh is a phenomenal singer. In another interview, he said "Arijit has the ability and the openness needed to make every recording a genuine collaboration. He's also a really nice guy, with no ego. That helps" Filmmaker Sanjay Leela Bhansali in an Interview with The Hindu said, "Arijit Singh is very special".

Shreya Ghoshal remarked that he "is versatile and has a soulful voice". Shankar Mahadevan said "I knew him before he became Arijit Singh. He is an educated musician, he understands his Sargam, and he has got depth. Suresh Wadkar praised him as one of the "great singers of this generation".

Personal life 
In 2014, Singh married Koel Roy, a childhood friend and a neighbour of his. They have two children.
Singh currently resides in Andheri, Mumbai. Singh says apart from being a singer, he is a badminton player, a writer, a movie freak and a documentary maker. He also likes cricket and cites  Sachin Tendulkar, Lance Klusener, Sourav Ganguly, and Jonty Rhodes as his favorite sportsmen. He is an ardent football fan, and a Manchester United fan. He has also expressed a wish to sing the anthem for the 2022 World Cup in Qatar. In badminton, he likes Saina Nehwal

Singh's mother, Aditi Singh, was admitted and underwent treatment for COVID-19 and recently tested negative but died due to a cerebral stroke on 20 May 2021.

Humanitarian work 
Singh said in an interview that he would love to serve people through his NGO named "Let There Be Light" which works for the Below Poverty Line community. His NGO aims to include activities like blood bank camp (with proof and records and photographs of all the blood being delivered properly), distribution of clothes, books, stationery, etc. to Below Poverty Line children on a huge scale and seasonal human ground activities.

Discography 

Some of his popular songs include "Channa Mereya", "Tum Hi Ho", "Phir Bhi Tumko Chahunga", "Uska Hi Banana", "Aayat", "Raabta", "Ik Vaari Aa", "Main Tara Boyfriend", Ae Dil Hai Mushkil", "Gerua", "Janam Janam", "Khamoshiyan", "Hamari Adhuri Kahani", "Samjhawan", "Sooraj Dooba Hain", "Khairiyat ", "Zaalima", "Laal Ishq",  "Muskurane", "Pachtaoge", "Rait Zara Si", "Shayad", "Tumse Bhi Zyada", "Aashiqui Aa Gayi", "Dhokha", "Phir Na Aisi Raat Aayegi" and "Kesariya".

Awards and nominations 

At the start of his singing career, he received nominations for the Upcoming Male Vocalist of the Year award at the 2013 Mirchi Music Awards for renditions of "Phir Le Aya Dil" and "Duaa", winning the award for the latter. Singh was awarded the Wizcraft Honour for the Best Live Performer, and was one of the top 10 artists from across the world to be featured at The SSE Arena, Wembley in the SSE Live Awards 2016.

Singh has received four Mirchi Music Awards, six Filmfare Awards, a Stardust Award, three IIFA Award, two Zee Cine Awards and two Screen Awards. He received Filmfare awards for five consecutive years from 2016 to 2020. He received nine awards from ten nominations for the song "Tum Hi Ho" from 2013 film Aashiqui 2. He also won the (IIFA) award in the category of "The Best Male Singer" for the song "Tum Hi Ho" in 2014.

In September 2014, The National Indian Students Union UK honored Singh with the Youth Icon – Music Award. He was named the most popular artist of 2014 by Hungama Digital Media Entertainment after winning an online poll conducted by music streaming website hungama.com.  Forbes India magazine's 100 Celebrity List placed him at rank 15 in 2016.

At the seventh Mirchi Music Awards in 2015, he was honored with the award for Best Male Vocalist for his rendition of the song "Samjhawan". He was nominated for the 60th Filmfare Awards, held in 2015 under Best Male Playback Singer category for two songs "Mast Magan" and "Suno Na Sangemarmar". He was voted online as the Best Male Singer by the readers of the IBN Live for the song "Muskurane". He won Best Male Playback Singer award at the 61st Filmfare Awards, held in 2016 for the rendition of the song "Sooraj Dooba Hain".

The GiMA, honoured him with awards for his rendition of the song "Soch Na Sake", He was subsequently honored for his rendition of the most popular film and radio song "Gerua", and the most streamed song "Sanam Re". The Times of India Film Awards 2016, nominated him for his rendition of three songs "Aayat", "Chunar" and "Hamari Adhuri Kahani".
In late 2016, Arijit received his first Stardust Award for Best Playback Singer (Male) for the song "Channa Mereya".  In 2017, he was nominated at Mirchi Music Awards under Male Vocalist of The Year category for four songs "Ae Dil Hai Mushkil", "Channa Mereya", "Bolna" and "Nashe Si Chadh Gayi". He won the award for the song "Ae Dil Hai Mushkil". He received a couple of nominations under Male Playback Singer category for "Channa Mereya" and "Ae Dil Hai Mushkil" from Ae Dil Hai Mushkil film in various award ceremonies in late 2016 and 2017.

He won the Filmfare Award for Best Male Playback Singer for the song "Tum Hi Ho" in 2014. He also won the (IIFA) award in the category of Best Male Singer for the song "Tum Hi Ho" in 2014. At the 7th Mirchi Music Awards 2015, he was awarded the Best Male Vocalist for his rendition of the song "Samjhawan".
Arijit had won IBN Live Movie Award for the song "Muskurane" in the Best Playback Singer category. He won Filmfare Award for Best Male Playback Singer for the song "Sooraj Dooba Hain" in 2016.
The GiMA awarded him for his rendition of the song "Soch Na Sake", he was awarded for the song "Gerua", and the most-streamed song "Sanam Re".
He was awarded the Best Male Singer for the song "Channa Mereya at the Stardust Awards 2016.
In 2017, at the 62nd Filmfare Awards, he won Best Male Playback Singer Award for the title song "Ae Dil Hai Mushkil", and also won the Male Vocalist of The Year award at 2017 Mirchi Music Awards, for his rendition of the song. He was awarded the Best Male Playback Singer award for the song at the Zee Cine Awards in 2017.

At the 23rd Star Screen Awards, Singh was awarded the title of Best Male Playback Singer for his rendition of the song "Zaalima" and songs of Jagga Jasoos.

At the 63rd Filmfare Awards of 2018, he was awarded the Best Male Playback Singer for "Roke Na Ruke Naina" from Badrinath Ki Dulhaniya and was nominated for "Zaalima" from Raees. With this win, he won the Filmfare award for four consecutive years.

At the 66th National Film Awards of 2019, he was awarded with the Best Male Playback Singer for "Binte Dil" from Padmaavat.

Singh was awarded the Best Male Playback Singer for his rendition of the song "Ae Watan" from the film Raazi at the International Indian Film Academy awards. Arijit Singh is awarded Filmfare award for best male playback singer for the song "Kalank" from the movie Kalank, with this he won the award for a record five consecutive times and six times overall.

See also 
 List of awards and nominations received by Arijit Singh
 List of Indian playback singers
 List of songs recorded by Arijit Singh

References

External links 

 

 
21st-century Indian singers
1987 births
Bengali Hindus
Bengali playback singers
Bollywood playback singers
Fame Gurukul contestants
Indian male playback singers
Indian rock singers
Living people
People from Murshidabad district
Pop rock singers
Indian folk-pop singers
Punjabi people
Singers from West Bengal
University of Kalyani alumni
Best Male Playback Singer National Film Award winners
Filmfare Awards winners
Screen Awards winners
International Indian Film Academy Awards winners
Zee Cine Awards winners
Converts to Hinduism from Sikhism